Charles Henry Parmelee (June 1, 1855 – January 22, 1914) was a Canadian publisher and politician.

Born in Waterloo, Canada East, the son of Rufus E. Parmelee and Eliza McVicar, Parmelee was editor of the Waterloo Advertiser
from 1875 to 1880, and commercial editor of the Montreal Herald from 1880 to 1883. In 1883, he re-joined the Advertiser. In 1887, Parmelee married Christina Rose. He was president of the Eastern Townships Press Association in 1893. He also served as a member of the town council for Waterloo and as secretary-treasurer for the Board of School Commissioners. Parmelee was elected to the House of Commons of Canada for the Quebec electoral district of Shefford in the 1896 federal election. A Liberal, he was re-elected in 1900 and 1904. He did not run in 1908.

References
 

1855 births
1914 deaths
People from Montérégie
Liberal Party of Canada MPs
Members of the House of Commons of Canada from Quebec